Rangsan Chayanram (born 8 July 1985), nicknamed Day (เดย์) and better known as Palangpol CP Freshmart (พลังพล ซีพีเฟรชมาร์ท), is a retired Thai professional boxer and a Muay Thai kickboxer. As a boxer, he challenged for the WBO junior-flyweight title in 2017.

Professional career
He was born in Mueang Buriram District, Buriram province. He has practiced Muay Thai since the age of 9 with more than 300 fights. He had bouts against the likes of Wanchai Kiatmuu9 Satanmuanglek Por.Satanmuang, Wanheng Menayothin, Paipharob Kokietgym, etc. He has won three championships in two different weight classes of the Rajadamnern Stadium and Lumpinee Boxing Stadium.

After moving under Petchyindee Boxing Promotion and adopted the name "Palangpol Petchyindee Academy" (พลังพล เพชรยินดีอะคาเดมี่), Palangpol struggled. At that time, Japanese boxer, Koki Eto travelled to Thailand to challenge for the WBA flyweight interim title against Kompayak Porpramook, he was pushed as Eto's sparring partner. He started his professional boxing career during this time.

He competed in Muay Thai and professional boxing alternately, winning the WBA Asia light flyweight title and highly ranked by the WBO.

On September 13, 2017, at the age of 32, he challenged the WBO world champion, Kosei Tanaka, at Edion Arena. Tanaka was a huge favorite going into the fight, but Palangpol would prove to be Tanaka's toughest challenger so far, dropping the defending champion once in the first round and trading back-and-forth combinations for the rest of the bout. After a thrilling fight, Tanaka would finally gain the upper hand in round 9, as he knocked down Palangpol and continued to land big combinations as the challenger struggled to connect. Eventually, the referee stepped in and stopped the fight at 1:52 in round 9. Tanaka was severely cut under his eyes, and was consequently sidelined after the fight. After the bout, Nattadej "Boat" Wachirarattanawong, his assistant manager, said that at his age he would continue competing in both Muay Thai and professional boxing.

Titles and accomplishments

Muay Thai
Rajadamnern Stadium
 2005 Rajadamnern Stadium 105 lbs Champion
 2008 Rajadamnern Stadium 108 lbs Champion

Lumpinee Stadium
 2003 Lumpinee Stadium 105 lbs Champion

World Professional Muaythai Federation
 2015 interim WPMF World Flyweight Champion

Professional boxing record

Muay Thai record

|-  style="background:#fbb;"
| 2018-06-11|| Loss ||align=left| Rungnarai Kiatmuu9 || Rajadamnern Stadium || Bangkok, Thailand || Decision || 5 || 3:00

|-  style="background:#fbb;"
| 2018-04-04|| Loss ||align=left| Jomhod Eminentair || Rajadamnern Stadium || Bangkok, Thailand || Decision || 5 || 3:00

|-  style="background:#fbb;"
| 2018-03-07|| Loss||align=left| Yothin FA Group || Rajadamnern Stadium || Bangkok, Thailand || Decision  || 5 || 3:00

|-  style="background:#cfc;"
| 2018-01-31|| Win ||align=left| Phetmuangchon Por.Suantong || Rajadamnern Stadium || Bangkok, Thailand || Decision || 5 || 3:00

|-  style="background:#fbb;"
| 2017-12-22|| Loss ||align=left| Rungnarai Kiatmuu9 || True4U Muaymanwansuk || Saraburi Province, Thailand || Decision || 5 || 3:00 
|-
! style=background:white colspan=9 |

|-  style="background:#cfc;"
| 2017-11-10|| Win ||align=left| Sarawut Sor.Jor.Vichitpadriew ||True4U Muaymunwansuk, Rangsit Stadium || Rangsit, Thailand || Decision || 5 || 3:00

|-  style="background:#cfc;"
| 2017-06-05|| Win ||align=left| Sarawut Sor.Jor.Vichitpadriew ||Rajadamnern Stadium || Bangkok, Thailand || Decision || 5 || 3:00

|-  style="background:#fbb;"
| 2017-05-04|| Loss||align=left| Rungnarai Kiatmuu9 || Rajadamnern Stadium || Bangkok, Thailand] || Decision || 5 || 3:00

|-  style="background:#fbb;"
| 2017-03-17|| Loss ||align=left| Nongyot Sitjakan ||True4U Muaymunwansuk, Rangsit Stadium || Rangsit, Thailand || KO (Left high kick)|| 5 ||

|-  style="background:#fbb;"
| 2017-02-04|| Loss ||align=left| Rungnarai Kiatmuu9 ||  || Isan, Thailand || Decision || 5 || 3:00

|-  style="background:#cfc;"
| 2017-01-12|| Win ||align=left| Phetrong Nayokkaipedriew ||Wanmeechai, Rajadamnern Stadium || Bangkok, Thailand || KO (Left hook)|| 3 || 

|-  style="background:#fbb;"
| 2016-12-12|| Loss ||align=left| Kiewpayak Jitmuangnon || Rajadamnern Stadium ||Bangkok, Thailand || Decision || 5 || 3:00

|-  style="background:#cfc;"
| 2016-11-14|| Win ||align=left| Kiewpayak Jitmuangnon  || Rajadamnern Stadium ||Bangkok, Thailand || Decision || 5 || 3:00

|-  style="background:#cfc;"
| 2016-09-05|| Win ||align=left| Sarawut Sor.Jor.Vichitpadriew ||Phetwiset, Rajadamnern Stadium || Bangkok, Thailand || Decision || 5 || 3:00

|-  style="background:#cfc;"
| 2016-08-01|| Win ||align=left| Nongyot Sitjekan ||Phetwiset, Rajadamnern Stadium || Bangkok, Thailand || Decision || 5 || 3:00

|-  style="background:#cfc;"
| 2016-05-09|| Win||align=left| Wanchai Kiatmuu9 || Wanmeechai, Rajadamnern Stadium || Bangkok, Thailand || Decision || 5 || 3:00

|-  style="background:#fbb;"
| 2016-04-07|| Loss||align=left| Yothin FA Group || Rajadamnern Stadium ||Bangkok, Thailand || Decision  || 5 || 3:00

|-  style="background:#fbb;"
| 2015-11-30|| Loss||align=left| Wanchai Kiatmuu9 || Wanmeechai, Rajadamnern Stadium || Bangkok, Thailand || Decision || 5 || 3:00

|-  style="background:#cfc;"
| 2015-11-09|| Win||align=left| Rungnarai Kiatmuu9 || Rajadamnern Stadium || Bangkok, Thailand || Decision || 5 || 3:00

|-  style="background:#cfc;"
| 2015-10-07|| Win ||align=left| Wanchai Kiatmuu9 || Wanmeechai, Rajadamnern Stadium || Bangkok, Thailand || Decision || 5 || 3:00

|-  style="background:#fbb;"
| 2015-08-11|| Loss ||align=left| Yothin FA Group || Lumpinee Stadium ||Bangkok, Thailand || Decision  || 5 || 3:00

|-  style="background:#cfc;"
| 2015-07-20|| Win||align=left| Rungnarai Kiatmuu9 || Rajadamnern Stadium || Bangkok, Thailand || Decision || 5 || 3:00

|-  style="background:#fbb;"
| 2015-05-13|| Loss ||align=left| Rungnarai Kiatmuu9 || Rajadamnern Stadium || Bangkok, Thailand || Decision || 5 || 3:00

|-  style="background:#cfc;"
| 2015-04-02 || Win ||align=left| Thanadet Tor.Pran 49 || Wanmeechai, Rajadamnern Stadium || Bangkok, Thailand || KO (Punches)|| 2 || 

|-  style="background:#fbb;"
| 2014-10-28|| Loss ||align=left| Wanchai Rambo-Isan || Petchyindee, Lumpinee Stadium || Bangkok, Thailand || Decision || 5 || 3:00

|-  style="background:#fbb;"
| 2014-08-28|| Loss ||align=left| Satanmuanglek Chitladagym || Rajadamnern Stadium || Bangkok, Thailand || Decision || 5 || 3:00

|-  style="background:#cfc;"
| 2014-07-08|| Win ||align=left| Ruengsak Sitniwat || Lumpinee Stadium  || Bangkok, Thailand || Decision || 5 || 3:00

|-  style="background:#cfc;"
| 2014-06-11|| Win ||align=left| Wanchai Rambo-Isan || Phetwiset Rajadamnern Stadium  || Bangkok, Thailand || Decision || 5 || 3:00

|-  style="background:#fbb;"
| 2014-01-03|| Loss ||align=left| Satanmuanglek Por.Satanmuang || Lumpinee Stadium || Bangkok, Thailand || Decision || 5 || 3:00

|-  style="background:#fbb;"
| 2013-11-29|| Loss||align=left| Morakot Komsaimai || Lumpinee Stadium || Bangkok, Thailand || KO (Right high kick)|| 3 || 

|-  style="background:#fbb;"
| 2013-10-01|| Loss ||align=left| Chaisiri Chor.KowYuhaIsuzu|| Lumpinee Stadium || Bangkok, Thailand || Decision || 5 || 3:00 

|-  style="background:#fbb;"
| 2013-09-04|| Loss ||align=left| Wanchai Rambo-Isan || Phetwiset + Wanmeechai, Rajadamnern Stadium || Bangkok, Thailand || Decision || 5 || 3:00

|-  style="background:#fbb;"
| 2013-07-19|| Loss ||align=left| Bangpleenoi 96Peenang || Lumpinee Stadium || Bangkok, Thailand || Decision || 5 || 3:00

|-  style="background:#fbb;"
| 2013-04-29|| Loss ||align=left| Petch Ekbangsai || Rajadamnern Stadium || Bangkok, Thailand || Decision || 5 || 3:00

|-  style="background:#cfc;"
| 2013-03-08|| Win ||align=left| Katapet Sor Suradet || Lumpinee Stadium || Bangkok, Thailand || Decision || 5 || 3:00

|-  style="background:#fbb;"
| 2013-02-01 || Loss ||align=left| Gusagonnoi Sor Junsen || Onesongchai, Lumpinee Stadium || Bangkok, Thailand || Decision || 5 || 3:00

|-  style="background:#cfc;"
| 2012-12-24|| Win ||align=left| Trakunpet Sor Sommai || Rajadamnern Stadium || Bangkok, Thailand || KO (Elbows)||  || 

|-  style="background:#fbb;"
| 2012-11-12|| Loss ||align=left| Trakunpet Sor Sommai || Rajadamnern Stadium || Bangkok, Thailand || Decision || 5 || 3:00

|-  style="background:#fbb;"
| 2012-09-12|| Loss ||align=left| Prajanchai Por Phetnamtong || Tor.Chaiwat, Rajadamnern Stadium || Bangkok, Thailand || Decision || 5 || 3:00

|-  style="background:#fbb;"
| 2012-06-08 || Loss||align=left| Superlek Wor.Sangprapai || Lumpinee Stadium || Bangkok, Thailand || Decision || 5 || 3:00

|-  style="background:#fbb;"
| 2012-05-10 || Loss ||align=left| Ruengsak Pansomboon || Rajadamnern Stadium || Bangkok, Thailand || Decision || 5 || 3:00

|-  style="background:#fbb;"
| 2012-03-27 || Loss||align=left| Superlek Wor.Sangprapai || Petchyindee, Lumpinee Stadium || Bangkok, Thailand || Decision || 5 || 3:00

|-  style="background:#cfc;"
| 2012-01-27|| Win ||align=left| Nokrajib Sitproad || Petchsupapan, Rajadamnern Stadium || Bangkok, Thailand || Decision || 5 || 3:00 

|-  style="background:#cfc;"
| 2011-09-15 || Win ||align=left| Kaewkla Kaewsamrit || Daorung Chujaroen, Rajadamnern Stadium || Bangkok, Thailand || Decision || 5 || 3:00

|-  style="background:#c5d2ea;"
| 2011-08-04 || Draw||align=left| Atthaphon Phithakmuangkhaen || Sor.Sommai, Rajadamnern Stadium  || Bangkok, Thailand || Decision  || 5 || 3:00

|-  style="background:#fbb;"
| 2011-07-05|| Losss ||align=left| Pompuen Kiatchongkhao || Petchsupapan, Lumpinee Stadium || Bangkok, Thailand || Decision || 5 || 3:00 

|-  style="background:#cfc;"
| 2011-05-30|| Win ||align=left| Pentai Singpatong || Rajadamnern Stadium || Bangkok, Thailand || KO (Elbow)||  || 

|-  style="background:#fbb;"
| 2011-03-17 || Loss||align=left| Mongkolchai Kwaitonggym || Rajadamnern Stadium  || Bangkok, Thailand || Decision  || 5 || 3:00

|-  style="background:#cfc;"
| 2011-01-19|| Win ||align=left| Phankomlek Kiatniwat || Rajadamnern Stadium || Bangkok, Thailand || Decision || 5 || 3:00

|-  style="background:#fbb;"
| 2010-12-23|| Loss ||align=left| Weerachai Wor.Wiwattanon || Rajadamnern Stadium Birthday event || Bangkok, Thailand || Decision || 5 || 3:00 

|-  style="background:#fbb;"
| 2010-10-14|| Loss ||align=left| Lamnamoon Sakchaichot || Onesongchai, Rajadamnern Stadium || Bangkok, Thailand || Decision || 5 || 3:00 

|-  style="background:#cfc;"
| 2010-08-30|| Win ||align=left| Hanchai Kiatyongyut || Rajadamnern Stadium || Bangkok, Thailand || Decision || 5 || 3:00

|-  style="background:#cfc;"
| 2010-08-09|| Win ||align=left| Rungruengchai Sor.Charoensiri || Daorung Chujaroen, Rajadamnern Stadium || Bangkok, Thailand || Decision || 5 || 3:00

|-  style="background:#fbb;"
| 2010-07-01|| Loss ||align=left| Polkrit Naplatrahuimuk|| Daorung Chujaroen, Rajadamnern Stadium || Bangkok, Thailand || Decision || 5 || 3:00 

|-  style="background:#fbb;"
| 2010-06-10|| Loss ||align=left| Fhasawang Tor.Sangtiennoi || Onesongchai, Rajadamnern Stadium || Bangkok, Thailand || Decision || 5 || 3:00 

|-  style="background:#cfc;"
| 2010-03-05 || Win ||align=left| Norasing Lukbanyai || Lumpinee Stadium || Bangkok, Thailand || Decision || 5 ||3:00 

|-  style="background:#cfc;"
| 2010-01-14 || Win ||align=left| Fahsawang Tor.Sangtiennoi || Onesongchai, Rajadamnern Stadium || Bangkok, Thailand || Decision || 5 ||3:00 

|-  style="background:#cfc;"
| 2009-12-10 || Win ||align=left| Hanchai Kiatyongyut || Onesongchai, Rajadamnern Stadium || Bangkok, Thailand || Decision || 5 || 3:00 

|-  style="text-align:center; background:#fbb;"
| 2009-09-17 || Loss ||align=left| Yodtongthai Por.Telakun || Onesongchai, Rajadamnern Stadium || Bangkok, Thailand || Decision || 5 || 3:00
|-
! style=background:white colspan=9 |

|-  style="background:#cfc;"
| 2009-07-03 || Win ||align=left| Norasing Lukbanyai || Lumpinee Stadium || Bangkok, Thailand || TKO (Elbow + knees) || 4 || 

|-  style="background:#cfc;"
| 2009-05-28 || Win ||align=left| Taweesak Singklongksi || Rajadamnern Stadium || Bangkok, Thailand || Decision || 5 || 3:00 

|-  style="background:#cfc;"
| 2009-03-12 || Win ||align=left| Taweesak Singklongksi || Onesongchai, Rajadamnern Stadium || Bangkok, Thailand || Decision || 5 || 3:00 

|-  style="background:#cfc;"
| 2008-12-18 || Win||align=left| Khiewba Sor.Ploenchit || Onesongchai, Rajadamnern Stadium || Bangkok, Thailand || Decision || 5 || 3:00

|-  style="background:#cfc;"
| 2008-11-02 || Win||align=left| Sirichoke Pharasomboon || Rajadamnern Stadium || Bangkok, Thailand || KO|| 3 || 

|-  style="background:#fbb;"
| 2008-09-18 || Loss||align=left| Payaknoi Wor.Wiwattanon || Onesongchai, Rajadamnern Stadium || Bangkok, Thailand || Decision || 5 || 3:00

|-  style="background:#cfc;"
| 2008-08-07 || Win||align=left| Khiewba Sor.Ploenchit || Onesongchai, Rajadamnern Stadium || Bangkok, Thailand || Decision || 5 || 3:00

|-  style="background:#cfc;"
| 2008-07-09 || Win||align=left| Yodprabsuek Por Khumphai || Rajadamnern Stadium || Bangkok, Thailand || Decision || 5 || 3:00

|-  style="background:#cfc;"
| 2008-06-09 || Win||align=left| Padejsuk Sunkilatha || Rajadamnern Stadium || Bangkok, Thailand || Decision || 5 || 3:00

|-  style="background:#fbb;"
| 2008-05-12 || Loss||align=left| Payaknoi Wor.Wiwattanon || Rajadamnern Stadium || Bangkok, Thailand || Decision || 5 || 3:00

|-  style="background:#cfc;"
| 2008-04-19 || Win||align=left| Namphet Sor.Thantip || Omnoi Stadium || Bangkok, Thailand || Decision || 5 || 3:00

|-  style="background:#cfc;"
| 2008-03-01 || Win||align=left| Payaknum Sitniwat || Omnoi Stadium || Bangkok, Thailand || Decision || 5 || 3:00

|-  style="background:#fbb;"
| 2008-01-30 || Loss||align=left| Payaknum Sitniwat || Kiatyongyut, Rajadamnern Stadium || Bangkok, Thailand || Decision || 5 || 3:00

|-  style="background:#cfc;"
| 2007-11-21 || Win ||align=left| Yodprabsuek Por Khumphai || Kiatsingnoi, Rajadamnern Stadium || Bangkok, Thailand || Decision || 5 || 3:00

|-  style="background:#fbb;"
| 2007-07-04 || Loss||align=left| Pakorn Sakyothin|| Onesongchai, Rajadamnern Stadium || Bangkok, Thailand || Decision || 5 || 3:00
  
|-  style="background:#cfc;"
| 2007-06-07 || Win ||align=left| Pakorn Sakyothin || Onesongchai, Rajadamnern Stadium || Bangkok, Thailand || Decision || 5 || 3:00

|-  style="background:#fbb;"
| 2007-05-05 || Loss||align=left| Pakorn Sakyothin || Onesongchai, Rajadamnern Stadium || Bangkok, Thailand || Decision || 5 || 3:00

|-  style="background:#fbb;"
| 2007-04-04 || Loss ||align=left| Hanchai Kiatyongyut || Onesongchai, Rajadamnern Stadium || Bangkok, Thailand || Decision || 5 || 3:00

|-  style="background:#cfc;"
| 2007-03-07 || Win ||align=left| Yodprabsuek Por Khumphai || Kiatyongyut, Rajadamnern Stadium || Bangkok, Thailand || Decision || 5 || 3:00

|- style="background:#fbb;"
|2007-01-22
|Loss
| align="left" | Luknimit Singklongsi
|Rajadamnern Stadium
|Bangkok, Thailand
|Decision
|5
|3:00

|-  style="background:#cfc;"
| 2006-12-20|| Win||align=left| Namphet Sor Thanthip || Phetchaopraya, Rajadamnern Stadium|| Bangkok, Thailand || Decision || 5 || 3:00

|-  style="background:#cfc;"
| 2006-10-28|| Win||align=left| Jomhod Eminentair || Onesongchai || Bangkok, Thailand || KO || 2 ||

|-  style="background:#cfc;"
| 2006-10-04|| Win ||align=left| Sudpatapee Dejrat || Onesongchai, Rajadamnern Stadium || Bangkok, Thailand  || Decision  || 5 || 3:00

|-  style="background:#fbb;"
| 2006-08-31|| Loss ||align=left| Jomhod Eminentair ||  Onesongchai, Rajadamnern Stadium || Bangkok, Thailand  || Decision  || 5 || 3:00

|-  style="background:#fbb;"
| 2006-06-26 || Loss ||align=left| Fahsang Tor.Pitakchai || Onesongchai, Rajadamnern Stadium || Bangkok, Thailand || Decision || 5 || 3:00 

|-  style="background:#fbb;"
| 2006-05-08 || Loss ||align=left| Norasing Lukbanyai || Rajadamnern Stadium || Bangkok, Thailand || KO || 1 || 

|-  style="text-align:center; background:#cfc;"
| 2006-04-06 || Win ||align=left| Chalermpon Petsupapan || Onesongchai, Rajadamnern Stadium || Bangkok, Thailand || Decision || 5 || 3:00

|-  style="text-align:center; background:#cfc;"
| 2006-02-16 || Win ||align=left| Petdam Sitboonmee || Onesongchai, Rajadamnern Stadium || Bangkok, Thailand || Decision || 5 || 3:00

|-  style="background:#fbb;"
| 2006-01-19 || Loss ||align=left| Binla Menayothin || Onesongchai, Rajadamnern Stadium || Bangkok, Thailand || Decision || 5 || 3:00 
|-
! style=background:white colspan=9 |

|-  style="text-align:center; background:#cfc;"
| 2005-11-14 || Win ||align=left| Petdam Sitboonmee || Rajadamnern Stadium || Bangkok, Thailand || Decision || 5 || 3:00

|-  style="text-align:center; background:#cfc;"
| 2005-09-26 || Win ||align=left| Wanheng Menayothin || Onesongchai, Rajadamnern Stadium || Bangkok, Thailand || Decision || 5 || 3:00

|-  style="text-align:center; background:#cfc;"
| 2005-09-01 || Win ||align=left| Yodpichit EmientAir || Onesongchai, Rajadamnern Stadium || Bangkok, Thailand || Decision || 5 || 3:00

|- style="background:#fbb;"
|2005-07-28
|Loss
| align="left" | Luknimit Singklongsi
|Rajadamnern Stadium
|Bangkok, Thailand
|Decision
|5
|3:00

|-  style="text-align:center; background:#cfc;"
| 2005-06-06 || Win ||align=left| Aidu 13CoinsExpress || Onesongchai, Rajadamnern Stadium || Bangkok, Thailand || Decision || 5 || 3:00

|-  style="text-align:center; background:#cfc;"
| 2005-04-06 || Win ||align=left| Aidu 13CoinsExpress || Onesongchai, Rajadamnern Stadium || Bangkok, Thailand || Decision || 5 || 3:00

|-  style="background:#fbb;"
| 2005-02-17 || Loss ||align=left| Phanfah Sor Damrongrit || Onesongchai,  Rajadamnern Stadium || Bangkok, Thailand || Decision || 5 || 3:00 

|- style="background:#cfc;"
|2005-01-20
|Win
| align="left" | Luknimit Singklongsi
|Onesongchai, Rajadamnern Stadium
|Bangkok, Thailand
|Decision
|5
|3:00

|-  style="background:#fbb;"
| 2004-11-11 || Loss ||align=left| Phanfah Sor Damrongrit || Rajadamnern Stadium || Bangkok, Thailand || Decision || 5 || 3:00 

|-  style="text-align:center; background:#cfc;"
| 2004-10-14 || Win ||align=left| Chalermphon Petsupan || Onesongchai, Rajadamnern Stadium || Bangkok, Thailand || Decision || 5 || 3:00

|-  style="text-align:center; background:#cfc;"
| 2004-08-16 || Win ||align=left| Yerman Somkirdkharka || Onesongchai, Rajadamnern Stadium || Bangkok, Thailand || Decision || 5 || 3:00

|-  style="text-align:center; background:#cfc;"
| 2004-07-19 || Win ||align=left| Wanheng Menayothin || Onesongchai, Rajadamnern Stadium || Bangkok, Thailand || Decision || 5 || 3:00

|-  style="background:#fbb;"
| 2004-05-10 || Loss ||align=left| Rungrat Narratrikul|| Onesongchai, Rajadamnern Stadium || Bangkok, Thailand || Decision || 5 || 3:00 

|-  style="text-align:center; background:#cfc;"
| 2004-02-26 || Win ||align=left| Oke Sor.Thantip || Jarumueang + Daorung Chujaroen, Lumpinee Stadium || Bangkok, Thailand || Decision || 5 || 3:00

|-  style="text-align:center; background:#cfc;"
| 2004-01-03 || Win ||align=left| Khaosod Sor Naowarat || Krikkrai, Lumpinee Stadium || Bangkok, Thailand || Decision || 5 || 3:00

|-  style="text-align:center; background:#fbb;"
| 2003-11-28 || Loss ||align=left| Napon Por.Puen Rouensang|| Lumpinee Stadium || Bangkok, Thailand || Decision || 5 || 3:00
|-
! style=background:white colspan=9 |

|-  style="text-align:center; background:#cfc;"
| 2003-10-10 || Win ||align=left| Kaichon Saengphanpla|| Lumpinee Stadium || Bangkok, Thailand || Decision || 5 || 3:00

|-  style="text-align:center; background:#cfc;"
| 2003-08-22 || Win ||align=left| || Lumpinee Stadium || Bangkok, Thailand || Decision || 5 || 3:00
|-
! style=background:white colspan=9 |
|-
| colspan=9 | Legend:

References

External links
 

1985 births
Living people
Palangpol CP Freshmart
Light-flyweight boxers
Palangpol CP Freshmart
Palangpol CP Freshmart